The Large Hadron Electron Collider (LHeC) is an accelerator study for a possible upgrade of the existing LHC storage ring - the currently highest energy proton accelerator operating at CERN in Geneva. By adding to the proton accelerator ring a new electron accelerator, the LHeC would enable the investigation of electron-proton and electron-ion collisions at unprecedented high energies and rate, much higher than had been possible at the electron-proton collider HERA at DESY at Hamburg, which terminated its operation in 2007. The LHeC has therefore a unique program of research, as on the substructure of the proton and nuclei or the physics of the newly discovered Higgs boson.
It is an electron–ion collider, similar to the plans in the US and elsewhere, although the present design would not include polarized protons.

The baseline design of the LHeC consists in two superconducting linear particle accelerators ("linacs") each about 1 km long, arranged in a racetrack configuration tangential to the LHC. Each linac provides about 10 GV acceleration, therefore the electrons makes three turns in the racetrack reaching an energy of about 60 GeV before colliding with the 7 TeV protons or 2.7 TeV lead ions. A unique feature of the design is the optimization for a particularly low power consumption. That is achieved by decelerating the electron beam after the collision and gaining back nearly all its energy into the radio-frequency cavities of the linacs, a principle termed energy recovery. Currently, preparations of an international collaboration with CERN are ongoing for developing superconducting accelerator cavities, at the appropriate frequency of 802 MHz. In parallel a design study for an energy recovery linac test platform is being pursued at CERN. Related to the proton and heavy ion physics of the LHC, the physics program and a detector for the LHeC are under study also. For maximum use of the operation time and resources of the LHC complex at CERN it is envisaged that electron-proton and proton-proton data are taken simultaneously. The LHeC electron beam may be combined with a multi-10-TeV proton beam in the far future, which is under consideration in a worldwide study at CERN since 2013.

References 
 "The Large Hadron-Electron Collider at the HL-LHC", 2020 update of the 2012 conceptual design report
 "Electrons at the LHC: a new beginning", CERN Courier, June 2014
 "A Large Hadron Electron Collider at CERN: Report on the Physics and Design Concepts for Machine and Detector", Journal of Physics G: Nuclear and Particle Physics, 2012
 "Electrons for the LHC", CERN Courier, April 2012

Proposed particle accelerators
Particle physics facilities
CERN
Large Hadron Collider